The 2012 Lux Style Awards, officially known as the 11th Lux Style Awards ceremony, presented by the Lux Style Awards honors the best films of 2011 and took place between 14 and 16 February 2012. This year, the city of Pakistan played host to the Pakistani Film Industry.

The official ceremony took place on 16 February 2012, at the Expo Centre, in Karachi. During the ceremony, The lux Style Awards were awarded in 27 competitive categories. The ceremony was televised in Pakistan and internationally on ARY Digital. Actor Reema Khan hosted the ceremony.

Background 
The Lux Style Awards is an award ceremony held annually in Pakistan since 2002. The awards celebrate "style" in the Pakistani entertainment industry, and honour the country's best talents in film, television, music, and fashion. Around 30 awards are given annually.

Winners and nominees 
Winners are listed first and highlighted in boldface.

Film

Television

Music

Fashion

Lifetime achievement award
Ahmed Rushdi

Lux Style Achievement Award 
Sharmeen Obaid-Chinoy

Best Dressed Female 
Sanam Chaudhry

Best Dressed Male 
Umair Tabani

References

External links

Lux Style Awards ceremonies
2012 film awards
2012 television awards
2012 music awards
2012 in Pakistani cinema
2012 in Pakistani music
2012 in Pakistani television
2010s in Karachi